This is a list of 277 species in Gelis, a genus of ichneumon wasps in the family Ichneumonidae.

Gelis species

 Gelis abortivus (Spinola, 1851) c g
 Gelis acarorum (Linnaeus, 1758) c g
 Gelis aciculatus (Strickland, 1912) c g
 Gelis adili Bogacev, 1946 c g
 Gelis agilis (Fabricius, 1775) c g
 Gelis alator Aubert, 1989 c g
 Gelis albanicus (Fahringer, 1923) c g
 Gelis albicinctoides Schwarz, 1998 c g
 Gelis albicinctus (Ruthe, 1859) c g
 Gelis albipalpus (Thomson, 1884) c g
 Gelis albopilosus Schwarz, 2002 c g
 Gelis alegininus Carlson, 1979 c g
 Gelis algericus (Habermehl, 1920) c
 Gelis alogus (Viereck, 1905) c g
 Gelis alopecosae Horstmann, 1986 c g
 Gelis alpinus (Strobl, 1901) c g
 Gelis alpivagus (Strobl, 1901) c g
 Gelis alternatus (Cresson, 1872) c
 Gelis anataelianus Ceballos, 1925 c g
 Gelis anatolicus Schwarz, 1998 c g
 Gelis aneichi Schwarz, 1998 c g
 Gelis annulatus (Strickland, 1912) c g
 Gelis anthracinus (Forster, 1850) c
 Gelis apantelicidus (Viereck, 1913) c g
 Gelis apantelis Cushman, 1927 c g
 Gelis aponius Schwarz, 2002 c g
 Gelis apterus (Pontoppidan, 1763) c g
 Gelis araneator Seyrig, 1926 c g
 Gelis areator (Panzer, 1804) c g
 Gelis areolatus Ceballos, 1927 c g
 Gelis ariamus Schwarz, 1998 c g
 Gelis asozanus (Uchida, 1930) c g
 Gelis asperatus (Fonscolombe, 1852) c g
 Gelis athracinus (Förster, 1850) g
 Gelis atratus (de Stefani, 1884) c g
 Gelis austriacus Schwarz, 1998 c g
 Gelis avarus (Forster, 1850) c g
 Gelis balcanicus Horstmann, 1993 c g
 Gelis balteatus (Cameron, 1905) c g
 Gelis belfragei (Ashmead, 1890) c g
 Gelis bellicus Bogacev, 1963 c g
 Gelis bicolor (Villers, 1789) c
 Gelis bicoloratus (Cresson, 1872) c g
 Gelis birkmani (Brues, 1903) c
 Gelis brassicae Horstmann, 1986 c g
 Gelis brevicauda (Thomson, 1884) c g
 Gelis brevis (Bridgman, 1883) c g
 Gelis brevistylus (Strickland, 1912) c g
 Gelis brevithorax Roman, 1936 c g
 Gelis bruesii (Strickland, 1912) c g
 Gelis brunneellus Schwarz, 2002 c g
 Gelis californicus (Ashmead, 1890) c g
 Gelis campbellensis Townes, 1964 c g
 Gelis canadensis (Cresson, 1872) c g
 Gelis canariensis Horstmann, 1986 c g
 Gelis carbonarius (de Stefani, 1884) c g
 Gelis caudator Horstmann, 1986 c g
 Gelis caudatulus Horstmann, 1997 c g
 Gelis caudatus (Rudow, 1917) c g
 Gelis cayennator (Thunberg, 1822) c g
 Gelis cinctus (Linnaeus, 1758) c
 Gelis circumdatus (Schiodte, 1839) c g
 Gelis claviventris (Strobl, 1901) c g
 Gelis cockerelli (Brues, 1910) c g
 Gelis coloradensis (Strickland, 1912) c g
 Gelis columbianus (Ashmead, 1890) c g
 Gelis compactus (Cresson, 1872) c g
 Gelis constantineanui Ciochia, 1974 c
 Gelis crassulus (Brues, 1903) c g
 Gelis cursitans (Fabricius, 1775) c g
 Gelis curvicauda Horstmann, 1993 c g
 Gelis cushmani Carlson, 1979 c g
 Gelis cyanurus (Forster, 1850) c g
 Gelis davidsonii (Ashmead, 1896) c g
 Gelis debilis (Provancher, 1886) c g
 Gelis declivis (Forster, 1850) c g
 Gelis delicatus (Cresson, 1872) c
 Gelis delumbis (Brues, 1910) c g
 Gelis dendrolimi (Matsumura, 1926) c
 Gelis difficilis (Hedwig, 1950) c g
 Gelis dimidiativentris (Rudow, 1917) c g
 Gelis discedens (Forster, 1850) c g
 Gelis dispar (Strickland, 1912) c g
 Gelis divaricatus Horstmann, 1993 c g
 Gelis drassi (Riley, 1892) c g
 Gelis edentatus (Forster, 1850) c g
 Gelis elongatus (Rudow, 1917) c g
 Gelis elymi (Thomson, 1884) c g
 Gelis escalerai Ceballos, 1925 c g
 Gelis exareolatus (Forster, 1850) c g
 Gelis excellens (Hedwig, 1961) c g
 Gelis fabularis Schwarz, 1998 c g
 Gelis falcatus Horstmann, 1986 c g
 Gelis fallax (Forster, 1850) c
 Gelis fasciitinctus (Dalla Torre, 1901) c g
 Gelis fenestralis (Brues, 1910) c g
 Gelis ferruginosus (Strickland, 1912) c g
 Gelis festinans (Fabricius, 1798) c g
 Gelis formicarius (Linnaeus, 1758) c g
 Gelis forticornis (Forster, 1850) c g
 Gelis fortificator Aubert, 1980 c g
 Gelis fortunatus Schwarz, 1993 c g
 Gelis fossae Schwarz, 2002 c g
 Gelis foveatus (Brues, 1910) c g
 Gelis fumipennis Horstmann, 1986 c g
 Gelis fuscicorniformis Ciochia, 1973 c g
 Gelis fuscicornis (Retzius, 1783) c g
 Gelis gallicator (Aubert, 1971) c g
 Gelis gelechiae (Ashmead, 1890) c g
 Gelis gibbifrons (Thomson, 1884) c g
 Gelis glacialis (Holmgren, 1869) c g
 Gelis gracillimus (Dalla Torre, 1902) c
 Gelis habilis (Brues, 1910) c g
 Gelis hammari (Viereck, 1912) c g
 Gelis hebraicator Aubert, 1971 c g
 Gelis heidenreichi Habermehl, 1930 c g
 Gelis helleni Kolarov, 1993 c g
 Gelis hispanicus Schwarz, 2002 c g
 Gelis hortensis (Christ, 1791) c g
 Gelis hypsibatus Schwarz, 1998 c g
 Gelis inermis (Viereck, 1903) c g
 Gelis infumatus (Thomson, 1884) c g
 Gelis insolitus (Howard, 1897) c g
 Gelis intermedius (Forster, 1850) c g
 Gelis inustus (Gravenhorst, 1829) c g
 Gelis inutilis Cushman, 1927 c g
 Gelis karakurti (Rossikov, 1904) c g
 Gelis keenii (Harrington, 1894) c g
 Gelis kiesenwetteri (Forster, 1850) c g
 Gelis kukakensis (Ashmead, 1902) c
 Gelis kumamotensis (Uchida, 1930) c g
 Gelis latrodectiphagus (Hesse, 1942) c g
 Gelis leiradoi Ceballos, 1925 c g
 Gelis lemae (Sonan, 1930) c
 Gelis leptogaster (Forster, 1850) c
 Gelis limbatus (Gravenhorst, 1829) c
 Gelis liparae (Giraud, 1863) c g
 Gelis longicauda (Thomson, 1884) c g
 Gelis longipes (Strickland, 1912) c g
 Gelis longistylus (Strickland, 1912) c g
 Gelis lucidulus (Forster, 1850) c g
 Gelis lymensis (Strickland, 1912) c g
 Gelis macer (Cresson, 1872) c
 Gelis macroptera (Strobl, 1901) c g
 Gelis maculatus (Strickland, 1912) c g
 Gelis maderi (Fahringer, 1923) c g
 Gelis maesticolor (Roman, 1933) c g
 Gelis mangeri (Gravenhorst, 1815) c g
 Gelis manni (Strickland, 1912) c g
 Gelis margaritae Bogacev, 1946 c g
 Gelis marikovskii Kuzin, 1948 c g
 Gelis maruyamensis (Uchida, 1932) c
 Gelis meabilis (Cresson, 1872) c g
 Gelis meigenii (Forster, 1850) c g
 Gelis melampus (Strobl, 1901) c g
 Gelis melanocephalus (Schrank, 1781) c g
 Gelis melanogaster (Thomson, 1884) c g
 Gelis melanogonus (Gravenhorst, 1829) c g
 Gelis melanophorus (Forster, 1851) c g
 Gelis merceti Ceballos, 1925 c g
 Gelis merops Schwarz, 2002 c g
 Gelis meuseli (Lange, 1911) c g
 Gelis micariae (Howard, 1892) c g
 Gelis micrurus (Forster, 1850) c g
 Gelis minimus (Walsh, 1861) c g
 Gelis mitis Schwarz, 1994 c g
 Gelis monozonius (Gravenhorst, 1829) c g
 Gelis mutillatus (Gmelin, 1790) c g
 Gelis nahanojus Schwarz, 1998 c g
 Gelis napocai Ciochia, 1974 c g
 Gelis nigerrimus (Dalla Torre, 1902) c g
 Gelis nigritulus (Zetterstedt, 1838) c g
 Gelis nigriventris (Brues, 1903) c g
 Gelis nigrofuscus (Strickland, 1912) c g
 Gelis nitidus Horstmann, 1986 c g
 Gelis nivariensis Schwarz, 1993 c g
 Gelis nocuus Cushman, 1927 c g
 Gelis notabilis (Forster, 1850) c g
 Gelis obesus (Ashmead, 1902) c g
 Gelis obscuratus (Strobl, 1901) c g
 Gelis obscuripes Horstmann, 1986 c g
 Gelis obscurus (Cresson, 1872) c
 Gelis operosus Schwarz, 2002 c g
 Gelis ornatulus (Thomson, 1884) c
 Gelis ostarrichi Schwarz, 1996 c g
 Gelis ottawaensis (Harrington, 1896) c g
 Gelis pallipes (Forster, 1851) c
 Gelis pamirensis Bogacev, 1963 c g
 Gelis papaveris (Förster, 1856) c g
 Gelis parens Schwarz, 1998 c g
 Gelis parfentjevi (Meyer, 1926) c g
 Gelis pauxillus (Kokujev, 1909) c g
 Gelis pavlovskii Jonaitis, 1981 c g
 Gelis pennsylvanicus (Strickland, 1912) c g
 Gelis perniciosus (Viereck, 1913) c
 Gelis petraeus Schwarz, 1998 c g
 Gelis pettitii (Cresson, 1872) c g
 Gelis pezomachorum (Ratzeburg, 1852) c g
 Gelis philpottii (Brues, 1922) c g
 Gelis picipes (Gravenhorst, 1829) c g
 Gelis piger (Kokujev, 1909) c g
 Gelis pilosulus (Thomson, 1884) c g
 Gelis popofensis (Ashmead, 1902) c g
 Gelis potteri Barron, 1987 c g
 Gelis povolnyi Sedivy, 1968 c g
 Gelis problematicus (Seyrig, 1952) c g
 Gelis problemator Aubert, 1989 c g
 Gelis prospectus Schwarz, 1998 c g
 Gelis prosthesimae (Riley, 1892) c g
 Gelis proximus (Forster, 1850) c
 Gelis pulicarius (Fabricius, 1793) c g
 Gelis pusillus (de Stefani, 1884) c g
 Gelis rabidae Barron, 1987 c g
 Gelis ragusae (de Stefani, 1884) c
 Gelis recens Schwarz, 2002 c g
 Gelis robustus (Strickland, 1912) c g
 Gelis rotundiceps (Cresson, 1872) c g
 Gelis rotundiventris (Forster, 1850) c g
 Gelis rubricollis (Thomson, 1884) c g
 Gelis ruficeps (Rudow, 1914) c g
 Gelis rufipes (Forster, 1850) c g
 Gelis rufogaster Thunberg, 1827 c g
 Gelis rufoniger Schwarz, 1998 c g
 Gelis rufotinctus (Bridgman, 1883) c g
 Gelis rugifer (Thomson, 1884) c g
 Gelis sanguinipectus (Schmiedeknecht, 1932) c g
 Gelis sapporoensis (Ashmead, 1906) c g
 Gelis schizocosae Barron & Bisdee, 1977 c g
 Gelis scvarskii (Rossikov, 1904) c g
 Gelis semirufus (de Stefani, 1884) c g
 Gelis sessilis (Provancher, 1874) c g
 Gelis seyrigi Ceballos, 1925 c g
 Gelis shafae Jonaitis & Alijev, 1988 c g
 Gelis shawidaani Schwarz, 2002 c g
 Gelis shushae Jonaitis & Alijev, 1988 c g
 Gelis sibiricus (Szépligeti, 1901) c
 Gelis solus Schwarz, 2002 c g
 Gelis speciosus (Hellen, 1949) c g
 Gelis spinula (Thomson, 1884) c g
 Gelis spiraculus (Strickland, 1912) c g
 Gelis spurius (Forster, 1850) c g
 Gelis stanfordensis (Strickland, 1912) c g
 Gelis stevenii (Gravenhorst, 1829) c g
 Gelis stigmaterus (Cresson, 1872) c g
 Gelis stigmaticus (Zetterstedt, 1838) c g
 Gelis stigmatus (Ashmead, 1890) c g
 Gelis stilatus (Rudow, 1914) c g
 Gelis striativentris Schwarz, 2003 c g
 Gelis stricklandi Townes, 1944 c g
 Gelis takadai Momoi, 1970 c g
 Gelis tantillus (Cresson, 1872) c g
 Gelis taschenbergii (Schmiedeknecht, 1897) c g
 Gelis tauriscus Schwarz, 1998 c g
 Gelis tenellus (Say, 1835) c g b
 Gelis tenerifensis Schwarz, 1993 c g
 Gelis terribilis Schwarz, 2002 c g
 Gelis texanus (Cresson, 1872) c
 Gelis thersites (Schmiedeknecht, 1933) c g
 Gelis thomsoni (Schmiedeknecht, 1933) c g
 Gelis thripites (Taylor, 1860) c g
 Gelis tibiator Schwarz, 2002 c g
 Gelis trux (Forster, 1850) c g
 Gelis tubulosus (Fahringer, 1923) c g
 Gelis turbator Schwarz, 2002 c g
 Gelis uniformis (Dalla Torre, 1902) c g
 Gelis urbanus (Brues, 1910) c g
 Gelis utahensis (Strickland, 1912) c g
 Gelis vagabundus (Forster, 1850) c g
 Gelis vasiljevi (Kokujev, 1912) c g
 Gelis venatorius (Forster, 1850) c g
 Gelis viduus (Forster, 1850) c g
 Gelis virginiensis (Ashmead, 1890) c g
 Gelis vulnerans (Forster, 1850) c g
 Gelis westerhauseri Gistel, 1857 c g
 Gelis wheeleri (Brues, 1903) c g
 Gelis yakutatensis (Ashmead, 1902) c g
 Gelis zeirapherator (Aubert, 1966) c g

Data sources: i = ITIS, c = Catalogue of Life, g = GBIF, b = Bugguide.net

References

Gelis